Alabama's 1st congressional district is a United States congressional district in Alabama, which elects a representative to the United States House of Representatives. It includes the entirety of Washington, Mobile, Baldwin, Escambia and Monroe counties, and also includes part of Clarke County. The largest city in the district is Mobile.

It is currently represented by Republican Jerry Carl.

Character
Mobile, Alabama is the focus of this district, which extends north along the Tombigbee and Alabama rivers. Timber production remains the biggest source of contributions to the local economy, however recently gulf coast condominium developments in Baldwin county represent new economic possibilities.

Politically, this area was one of the first in Alabama to shake off its Democratic roots. It was one of five districts to swing Republican in 1964, when Barry Goldwater swept the state. The GOP has held the district in every House election since then, usually by landslide margins; indeed, a Democrat has only managed 40 percent of the vote once since the current GOP run began in the district. However, conservative Democrats continued to hold most state and local offices well into the 1990s.

It supported George W. Bush with 60% of the vote in 2000, and with 64% in 2004. In 2008, John McCain received 61.01% of the vote in the district while 38.38% supported Barack Obama.

The 1st traditionally gives its congressmen very long tenures in Washington, D.C. Only nine men have represented the district in Congress since 1897, with all but two holding the seat for at least 10 years.

Voting

List of members representing the district

Recent election results
These are the results from the previous ten election cycles in Alabama's 1st district.

2002

2004

2006

2008

2010

2012

2013 (Special)

2014

2016

2018

2020

2022

See also

Alabama's congressional districts
List of United States congressional districts
Redistricting in the United States

References
Specific

General
 
 
 Congressional Biographical Directory of the United States 1774–present
 A New Nation Votes

External links
CNN coverage of the 2004 election
CNN coverage of the 2002 election
CNN coverage of the 2000 election

01
Baldwin County, Alabama
Clarke County, Alabama
Escambia County, Alabama
Mobile County, Alabama
Monroe County, Alabama
Washington County, Alabama
Constituencies established in 1823
1823 establishments in Alabama
Constituencies disestablished in 1841
1841 disestablishments in Alabama
Constituencies established in 1843
1843 establishments in Alabama
Constituencies disestablished in 1963
1963 disestablishments in Alabama
Constituencies established in 1965
1965 establishments in Alabama